The Men's pole vault event  at the 2005 European Athletics Indoor Championships was held on March 4–5.

Medalists

Results

Qualification
Qualification: Qualification Performance 5.75 (Q) or at least 8 best performers advanced to the final.

Final

References
Results

Pole vault at the European Athletics Indoor Championships
Pole